Krantivira Sangolli Rayanna Railway Station is an underground metro station on the Purple Line of the Namma Metro serving Subhash Nagar, Sevashrama, Bangalore. It was opened to the public on 30 April 2016.

A foot overbridge connecting the metro station with platform 10 of the Bangalore City railway station was opened on 18 February 2019. The BMRC reported that monthly ridership at the metro station was 175,000 passengers per day prior to opening the bridge, and increased to 250,000 two months after its opening.

Station layout

Entry/Exits
There are 5 Entry/Exit points – A, B, C, D and E. Commuters can use either of the points for their travel.

 Entry/Exit point A: Towards KSR Bengaluru Railway Stn.
 Entry/Exit point B: Towards Shree Angala Parameshwari Temple side
 Entry/Exit point C: Towards Tank Bund Road side
 Entry/Exit point D: Towards Tank Bund Road side with wheelchair accessibility
 Entry/Exit point E: Towards Minerva Mills Road side

See also
Bangalore
List of Namma Metro stations
Transport in Karnataka
List of metro systems
List of rapid transit systems in India
Bangalore Metropolitan Transport Corporation

References

External links

 Bangalore Metro Rail Corporation Ltd. (Official site) 
 UrbanRail.Net – descriptions of all metro systems in the world, each with a schematic map showing all stations.

Namma Metro stations
Railway stations in India opened in 2016
2016 establishments in Karnataka
Railway stations in Bangalore